Silesian (Silesian:), Silesian German or Lower Silesian is a nearly extinct German dialect spoken in Silesia. It is part of the East Central German language area with some West Slavic and Lechitic influences. Silesian German emerged as the result of Late Medieval German migration to Silesia, which had been inhabited by Lechitic or West Slavic peoples in the Early Middle Ages.

Until 1945, variations of the dialect were spoken by about seven million people in Silesia and neighboring regions of Bohemia and Moravia. After World War II, when the province of Silesia was incorporated into Poland, with small portions remaining in northeastern Czech Republic and in eastern Germany, the local communist authorities expelled the German-speaking population and forbade the use of the language.

Silesian German continued to be spoken only by individual families, only few of them remaining in their home region, but most of them expelled to the remaining territory of Germany. Most descendants of the Silesian Germans expelled to West and East Germany no longer learned the dialect, and the cultural gatherings were less and less frequented.

A remaining German minority in Opole Voivodeship continues use of German in Upper Silesia, but only the older generation speaks the Upper Silesian dialect of Silesian German in today's Poland.

History 

In origin, Silesian German appears to derive from 12th-century dialects of Middle High German, including medieval forms of Upper Saxon German, East Franconian German and Thuringian. The German-speaking inhabitants of Silesia are thought to be descendants of settlers from Upper Lusatia, Saxony, Thuringia and Franconia who first arrived in Silesia (back then part of Piast Poland) in the 13th century.

By migration over the Sudetes, the language spread to neighboring regions of Bohemia. In the 13th century, German-speaking settlers from Silesia arrived at the region around Trautenau  (Trutnov), and the region around Freiwaldau (Jeseník), often founding settlements in previously uninhabited  mountainous areas.

After World War II, local communist authorities forbade the use of the language. After the forcible expulsion of the Germans from Silesia, German Silesian culture and language nearly died out when most of Silesia became part of Poland in 1945. Polish authorities banned the use of the German language. There are still unresolved feelings on the sides of both Poles and Germans, largely because of Nazi Germany's war crimes on Poles and the forced expulsion and ethnic cleansing of native Germans from former German territories that were transferred to Poland in the wake of the Potsdam Agreement.

The German Silesian dialect is not recognized by the Polish State in any way, although the status of the German minority in Poland has improved much since the 1991 communist collapse and Polish entry into the European Union.

Silesian can be grouped like this:
  (East Central German or East Middle German)
  (Silesian)
  (Mountain Silesian)
 
 
 
  (South-East Silesian)
 
 
 
  (Middle or Central Silesian)
  (West Silesian)
 

Silesian German was the language in which the poetry of Karl von Holtei and Gerhart Hauptmann was written, during the 19th century.

Grammar

Personal pronoun 

Notes:
 Contrasted are: unemphasised form / emphasised form
 Abbreviations: GS := Gebirgsschlesisch, LS := Lausitz-Schlesisch, NL := Niederländisch
 Symbols, transcribed into IPA: e = [ɛ], ę̄ = [ɛː], ẹ̄ = [eː], ə = [ə], i = [ɪ], ī = [iː], o = [ɔ], ọ = [o], ọ̄ = [oː], u = [ʊ], ū = [uː], ć͜h = [ç], ſ = [z], s = [s], ſ̌ = [ʒ]

See also 
 Alzenau dialect
 Wymysorys language

References 

Silesian culture
Endangered Germanic languages
Central German languages
German dialects
Languages of Poland
Languages of the Czech Republic
Languages of Germany